Chandra Maharjan is a member of 2nd Nepalese Constituent Assembly. He won Lalitpur–2 seat in 2013 Nepalese Constituent Assembly election from Nepali Congress.

Personal life
Chandra Maharjan was born on 16 November 1954 in Subahal, Lalitpur-8 to Chandra Man Maharjan and Buddhi Maya Maharjan. He has two sons and three daughters. He holds a bachelor's degree in Political Science. He is the vice-president of Jyapu Samaj-Yala, general secretary of Ganeshman Singh Study Foundation and founder member of Rotary Club.

Political career
Maharjan began his political career from CPN (Fourth Convention) in 1972. He was a representative of Nepali Congress General Convention. He was initially inclined to communist philosophy but joined NC after the referendum of 1980. He also served as  the central member of NC's association of ethnic communities. Maharjan has also worked as district president and was also elected as deputy mayor of Lalitpur Sub-metropolitan City in 1992. In the 2008 Nepalese Constituent Assembly election, Maharjan was defeated from Lalitpur-2 with 16,392 votes.

References

1954 births
Nepali Congress politicians from Bagmati Province
People from Lalitpur District, Nepal
Living people
Members of the 2nd Nepalese Constituent Assembly